Amphicallia pactolicus is a moth of the subfamily Arctiinae first described by Arthur Gardiner Butler in 1888. It is found in Cameroon, the Democratic Republic of the Congo, Kenya, Nigeria, Rwanda, Tanzania, Togo and Uganda.

The larvae feed on Crotalaria species.

References

Moths described in 1888
Arctiini
Moths of Africa